The rolling stock of the Washington Metro system consists of 1,318  cars that were acquired across seven orders. All cars operate as married pairs (consecutively numbered even-odd), with systems shared across the pair. The 7000-series cars, the system's newest, have an operator's cab in only one of each married pair's cars and operate in groups of four.

, Metro owned a fleet of 1,318 cars, 1,286 of which were in active revenue service.

In the "Active railcars" table, font in bold represents the railcars that are currently in service while the regular font in the other tables represent cars that are retired or on order.

Rail yards 
There are nine Metrorail storage and overhaul facilities totaling more than 1.3 million square feet of workspace. One is currently under construction and another is under development.

Active

2000-series 

The second order, of 76 cars, was through Breda Costruzioni Ferroviarie, with delivery in 1982. These cars are numbered 2000–2075, and were rehabilitated in 2002 to 2004 by Alstom in Hornell, New York.

Features 
These cars were the first cars to feature a single flip-dot sign above a window next to the center doors, instead of two rollsigns originally found on the 1000-series cars before rehabilitation. In place of the second rollsign, these cars were also the first to feature an exterior loudspeaker, as the 1000-series cars lacked loudspeakers until they were rehabbed in 1993. The bulkhead on these cars were slightly higher than the 1000-series cars and also have the flip-dot destination signs. Unlike the 1000 Series, there is less seating in the 2000 Series, by having 14 fewer seats, although retaining the same amount of standing area capacity. In 2002, as part of the rehabilitation project, the 2000-series cars received new three-phase AC propulsion systems with IGBT technology, replacing the original cam-controlled DC propulsion systems. Also included were railcar monitoring systems, advanced ATC/ATS control systems, exterior LED destination signs, interior LED next stop signs and, improved emergency exit signage. The refurbished railcars also received the red, white and blue interior found on the 5000-series cars.

Uses & Storage 
Cars 2016–2017 were removed from service with their seats and carpet removed and were converted into money train pairs, which replaced the 1000 series running the route.

Beginning in 2020, these cars were gradually placed into long term cold storage due to the COVID-19 pandemic. They were never often in service since then due to reduced service. However, some were brought out when the 6000 series were sidelined but then once again stored. When the 7000 series were sidelined from service, these cars began to gradually return to service once again to fill in the shortage gap.

Retirement 
WMATA is expecting to begin retiring the 2000-series cars in 2024 which would last into 2025.

3000-series 

The third order consisted of 290 cars, also from Breda, with delivery in 1987. These cars are numbered 3000–3289 as delivered and were also rehabilitated in 2004 to 2009 by Alstom in Hornell, New York.

Features 
These cars were the next to feature a single flip-dot sign like the 2000-series cars, along with an exterior loudspeaker. As part of this rehabilitation project in 2004, they received AC propulsion systems with IGBT technology, replacing the chopper-controlled DC propulsion system. Also included in the rehabilitation was the addition of railcar monitoring systems, advanced ATC/ATS control systems, exterior LED destination signs, interior LED next stop signs, and improved emergency exit signage. The refurbished 3000-series cars also received the red, white and blue interior found on the 5000-series cars.

Incidents 
On January 6, 1996, a revenue train collided with an out-of-service train, both consisting entirely of Breda 3000-series cars, at the  station, fatally injuring the operator of the revenue train. Car 3252, the lead car of the revenue train, collided with 3191, the car at the inbound end of the out-of-service train. The mates of these two cars, 3253 and 3190 respectively, were later mated together. 3190 reentered revenue service as 3290, and 3253 reentered service as 3291. However, 3252 and 3191 were retained by WMATA for training purposes.

On November 29, 2009, a collision occurred between two out-of-service trains at the Falls Church rail yard in Fairfax County, Virginia. Car 3216, the lead car of one of the trains, was damaged beyond repair. Three Metro employees with minor injuries were taken to a local hospital. The NTSB planned to launch an investigation of the incident. As a result, car 3217 is stored out of service.

On May 21, 2019, WMATA temporarily removed all 3000-series railcars from service following reports of door malfunctions.

On October 7, 2019, at 12:54 am, two out-of-service 3000-series trains collided between Foggy Bottom and Farragut West, injuring two operators. Train 755 (the stationary train) consisted of cars 3141, 3140, 3121, 3120, 3206 and 3207, and Train 700 (the striking train) consisted of cars 3008, 3009, 3010, 3011, 3019 and 3018. Car 3008, the lead car of the striking train, struck car 3207 from the stationary train. Both cars suffered damage as of a result. Cars 3140 and 3120 also suffered broken couplers during the collision as well. Cars 3008, 3009, 3120, 3121, 3206, and 3207 were damaged beyond repair.

Pilot programs 
Beginning in 2005, a number of 3000-series cars that had not yet undergone rehabilitation were modified as part of a pilot program to study passenger movements to improve the seating arrangement for future rail cars. Sixteen cars received a new seating arrangement that included modified handholds and seat positions, including some longitudinal seating. These cars, as well as other cars being used as control cars in the experiment, received on-board cameras in order for planners to observe passenger movements.

Around August 2008, Metrorail tested new overhead handles of different styles on 3034, 3035, 3094, 3095 as well as some 1000-series cars to gauge public opinion.

Select 3000-series cars were fitted with a vinyl wrap as a pilot program in 2017. This wrap is also found on cars 6180–6181.

Retirement 
WMATA is expecting to begin replacing its 3000-series cars beginning in 2025 with the last ones being phased out in 2029.

6000-series 

 Subsequently, Metro ordered 184 rail cars from Alstom, the same company that rehabilitated the Breda 2000 and 3000-series cars. Delivery began in late 2005 and continued through 2008.

Features 
The 6000-series look similar to the 5000-series cars built by CAF but feature revised styling. The bulkhead doors have rounded windows compared to squared and a revised operator window design that eliminates the top horizontal bar. These stylistic features are similar to what is found on the Rohr 1000-series cars. A major change that occurred for the first time since the Breda 2000-series cars was the reduction of seating. The 6000-series cars seat 64 instead of 68.

The interior was completely redesigned to allow for additional standing room (mostly around the center doors) and easier access to all portions of the car. New to the 6000-series cars is the addition of two interior LED next stop indicators located at the center of the car, which brings the total to four interior displays per car (two facing each direction). Also new is an intercom located next to the center doors; previous rail cars only have them at the front and back of each car.

Another new feature is that they are the first series of cars manufactured with the flashing brake indicators on the far ends of each car. These are similar to what was used on the Rohr cars, and the current rehabilitated Bredas, indicating when the train is in the final stages of stopping. Mechanically, the 6000-series cars features the same cast trucks as the CAF cars, and use the same propulsion systems and advanced cab signaling systems found in the Breda 2000/3000-series rehabilitation from Alstom.

The body shells of the 6000-series were built in Barcelona, Spain, with assembly completed in Hornell, New York.

Delivery 

On November 17, 2008, Metro completed the installation of new stainless steel-grab bars to all 184 6000-series cars.

Pilot programs 
In 2007, Metro began testing new resilient flooring on four 6000-series cars (6104+6105, 6142+6143) and announced in November 2013 that within two years, all 6000-series cars would feature the new flooring.

Metro tested new fabric seating on cars 6026–6027. This type of seating was also installed on cars 6014–6015.

Metro is planning to add automated announcements on all 6000-series railcars once refurbishment is complete, which will meet up with 7000-series standards.

Cars 6180–6181 were fitted with a vinyl wrap, which replaces the brown painting on the sides of the cars. On the inside, new resilient flooring and new blue seats were installed to match the new 7000-series cars. A dozen 6000-series and 3000-series cars received these features. If the pilot program goes well, the remaining cars will be given the new look. WMATA says repainting would cost $14,055 per car, while implementing a vinyl wrap costs only $4,776. Metro's Richard Jordan also claims this method is more environmentally friendly compared to painting. The aluminum surface requires harsh chemicals which have to be treated before put down the sewer.

In March 2022, Metro tested an updated floor pattern on car 6043 which features the blue handicap sign, the Metro logo on the floor, and white stripes.

Incidents 
6050–6051 suffered major body damage in a derailment at New Carrollton Yard in January 2013. 6050 was sent to Upstate New York to be repaired at the Alstom Plant. 6051 is currently stored at Greenbelt Yard. As of October 2021, 6050 has since been re-coupled back with 6051 and are awaiting re-entry into service.

6038–6039 separated from each other while operating on the Silver Line between McLean and East Falls Church station. The set was repaired and returned to service in late 2018.

On November 24, 2020, all 6000-series railcars were removed from service following two train-separation incidents on the Red Line in a one-month span. The first incident happened on October 9, 2020, when cars 6075 and 6079 separated from each other between NoMa and Union station, causing service to be suspended between Gallery Place and Rhode Island Avenue stations. The second incident happened on November 24, 2020, when cars 6150 and 6177 pulled apart from each other while departing Glenmont station, causing rail service to be suspended between Glenmont and Forest Glen stations. Both incidents caused no injuries. On May 18, 2021, WMATA announced that all 6000 series would remain sidelined indefinitely. The cars gradually returned to service starting on the Red Line on September 23, 2021, with more trains coming into service throughout the following weeks.

Other uses 

6182–6183 were removed from passenger service and now serve as "money train" cars in a yellow vinyl wrap. These cars replaced cars 8000–8001 (formerly 1010–1011), one of three 1000-series pairs that originally served on the money train.

7000-series 

In April 2013, WMATA moved forward with plans to order 528 railcars from Kawasaki, called the 7000-series, to replace the 1000 and 4000-series cars, and to provide service for the Dulles Corridor Metrorail Project, otherwise known as the Silver Line.

Features 
In a February 8, 2007, press release, Metro stated that the new 7000-series cars would have a similar appearance to the 6000-series cars manufactured by Alstom. However, in a January 2008 press release, Metro indicated that the design for the 7000-series cars would have a completely different appearance from that of the current rail cars. The exterior would feature a stainless steel body rather than the aluminum of earlier designs. Inside, seats would be taller and more ergonomically designed, carpeting would be replaced with a resilient floor covering, the grab bars along the ceiling would contain spring-loaded handles, and the cars would contain security cameras, automated announcements, as well as LCD displays to provide train information.

Like previous cars, 7000-series cars are configured as semi-permanently coupled married pairs. However, unlike previous cars, the 7000-series cars do not have an operator's cab in every car: even-numbered "A" cars have operator's cabs, while odd-numbered "B" cars do not. The "B" cars can be operated as necessary using smaller hostler controls instead. The married pairs are composed of one of each type. This arrangement favors four- and eight-car trains in A–B–B–A and A–B–B–A–A–B–B–A configurations, but six-car trains in A–B–B–A–B–A and trains in any configuration are also possible. The following diagram depicts an eight-car train, with couplers represented by crosses and semi-permanent link bars represented by dashes.

Delivery 
The 7000-series cars are so technologically advanced as to render them incompatible with the existing fleet. Presented with that issue, Metro's board members recognized the seriousness of the decision, but former Metro general manager John B. Catoe indicated that the board needed to decide "in months" on whether to go ahead with the rail car order, regardless of whether or not the Dulles extension was approved.

The bidding process began in December 2008. WMATA issued a notice to proceed to Kawasaki on July 27, 2010, after receiving funding from the Federal Transit Administration, although delivery was delayed due to issues with suppliers following the 2011 Tōhoku earthquake and tsunami.

Under the contract, Metro originally agreed to purchase 428 7000-series railcars, both to replace its 1000-series cars and provide service for the new Silver Line. In April 2013, Metro elected to exercise an option in the contract to purchase an additional one hundred cars to replace its one hundred 4000-series cars, which it decided do not warrant being overhauled in light of chronic mechanical issues. In September 2013, Metro announced it exercised another option under the contract to purchase an additional 220 railcars, bringing the total order to 748 railcars. In total, the new 7000-series railcars currently make up more than half of Metro's rolling stock as of 2020. In November 2013, it was reported that the first four cars would arrive before the end of 2013 and that they would then be tested for 30 weeks, allowing Metro to troubleshoot any issues before full production begins.

Metro unveiled the first 7000-series quad set at Greenbelt on January 6, 2014. The set underwent acceptance testing for at least eight months in order to finalize design specs and work out any problems. In September 2014, Metro reported that it was about one month away from finishing tests on the 7000-series test train, and it stated that it expected an eight-car train made up of 7000-series cars would start carrying passengers in early 2015, and Metro would have 56 railcars by June 2015. During that time, Metro revealed that during testing, a software issue was discovered that it was still addressing, although Metro was confident that the hardware itself was solid. Metro had indicated that the mass production schedule called for 56 new cars to be delivered by June 2015. Combined with the eight cars in the test group, that would give Metro 64 new cars, meaning eight 7000-series trains of eight cars each would be in service the next summer. After that, 300 more cars would arrive by February 2017, followed by an additional 100, for a total of 528 new cars at an overall cost of $1.46 billion.

Metro warned its funding partners – VA, MD and DC – that its option to purchase an additional 220 7000-series cars expired in June 2015 and required a funding commitment of $614 million for rolling stock, and $856 million for related infrastructure upgrades. Subsequently, in June 2015, the Federal Transit Administration cleared a major obstacle that was preventing Metro from purchasing the additional 220 railcars by approving an early retirement for the 192 5000-series railcars in order to avoid expenses and to upgrade rail service. Metro's funding partners, VA, MD and DC, agreed to fund the additional purchase of 220 7000-series cars, bringing the total purchase up to 748 railcars.

The first 7000-series train debuted on the Blue Line on April 14, 2015. 7000-series trains subsequently entered service on the Red line on June 8, 2015, the Orange Line in July, and the Green and Yellow Lines on August 17, 2015. On March 8, 2018, WMATA accepted delivery of its 500th 7000-series car. On February 26, 2020, WMATA accepted delivery of the final 7000-series railcars (7746–7747), completing the order.

Issues 

In June 2016, the 7000-series was taken out of service on the Blue, Orange, and Silver Lines after Metro discovered that trains could lose contact with the third rail on a steep curve, which caused the train to shut down outside .

On December 31, 2016, a Washington Post article reported that some residents in DC's Petworth neighborhood were noticing increased noise and vibration levels attributed to the heavier, steel-bodied 7000-series trains. According to the article, Metro engineers conducted initial field tests and noted only "negligible vibration levels." Metro spokesman Richard L. Jordan stated: "Metro is in the process of bringing in third-party engineers to conduct additional tests before we make a final determination." A March 3, 2017, report from WAMU noted that some residents in North Michigan Park and Southwest Waterfront were also experiencing increased noise and vibrations since the 7000-series trains entered service on the Green Line. The same WAMU report stated that Metro has hired the California-based company Wilson Ihrig to conduct "field testing in selected homes."

In August 2018, The Washington Post reported that all delivered cars came with defective wiring that had to be replaced. In addition, WMATA began playing the announcement "This is a 7000-series train" whenever the train doors opened. This was intended as a temporary measure to aid the disabled because the types of barriers that separated the 7000-series cars posed safety risks for the blind. The FTA ordered WMATA to fix the barriers before the end of 2018, but WMATA could not meet that deadline. However, the barriers began appearing on 7000-series railcars in October 2018.

In late June 2019, WMATA announced that all 7000-series railcars were fitted with the new safety chains and phased out the "This is a 7000-series train" announcement.

On October 17, 2021, WMATA announced they would temporarily remove all 7000-series railcars on October 18, 2021, due to potential defects on their axles. This was due to a 7000 series derailing on the Blue Line on October 12, 2021, after one axle of the derailed train was found to be out of compliance with the specification of the wheel assembly. The result of the cars being pulled caused severe service reduction on all Metro lines. During the inspections, it was revealed that 20 axles were out of alignment. In December 2021, Metro presented early plans at a board meeting for gradual reintegration of the unaffected 7000-series railcars, pending NTSB approval. Also in December, four U.S. senators wrote to Metro requesting full details of actions taken regarding the wheel alignment issues and the cost incurred.

On December 14, 2021, WMATA announced they would return at most, 336 7000-series railcars back into service. They would then pause for 90 days without further release of additional cars until all aspects of the new inspection cycles are fully established and any needed adjustments are made under the Washington Metrorail Safety Commission oversight. Two 8-car 7000-series trains then re-entered service (one on the Blue line and one on the Silver) on December 17, 2021. About 72 railcars returned to service before WMATA announced on December 23, 2021, they would suspend returning additional 7000-series railcars to service and inspect them on a daily basis. The cars that already returned to service remained so until December 29, 2021, when WMATA discovered an issue in at least five of the returned railcars.

On January 12, 2022, WMATA announced 7000-series trains would remain out of passenger service for about 90 days (estimated April 2022) to allow engineering and mechanical experts time to focus on the root cause of the derailment and acquire new technology to measure 7000-series wheelsets. On March 24, 2022, WMATA CEO Paul Wiedefeld announced 7000-series trains would remain out of passenger service again until summer, 2022. However, WMATA announced a new safety plan to have the 7000-series railcars inspected daily. Metro installed the first of the automated inspection devices in May, and reaffirmed that the 7000-series would return to service in summer 2022.

On May 24, 2022, WMATA announced they would be putting eight 7000-series trains in service in the following weeks. A plan to return the 7000-series was announced on May 19, 2022 to be conducted in three phases. On June 15, 2022, WMATA announced they would return eight 7000-series train sets beginning on June 16, 2022, resulting in 64 active railcars, which would be in the 7500-7747 range. On September 2, 2022, WMATA announced they would return at least 20 7000-series trains back into service after updating its return-to-service plan over the summer. By then, more 7000-series in the 7000-7499 range began returning to service with most slowly being reactivated. By October 2022, WMATA began Phase 2 of the plan where cars will be qualified for service every four days and there would be no limit on which railcars can be in service. In January 2023, WMATA announced they were cleared to begin Phase 3 of its Return to Service plan where cars will be inspected every week instead of every four days. Rail service would return to normal by February 2023. In March 2023, WMATA announced they will fix all axles on all 7000-series railcars over the next three years.

Future

8000-series 

Following the replacement of the 1000, 4000 and 5000-series cars with the new 7000-series between 2016 and 2018, Metro proposed that all 366 2000-series and 3000-series cars be replaced by the 8000-series cars. Metro considered using an open gangway married pair- or quad-configuration design concept for the 8000-series railcars, but decided against advancing those designs, making them similar in appearance to the 7000-series. In February 2023, WMATA decided to re-evaluate the open gangway design for potential improvements in accessibility and capacity.

Early plans for the 8000 series procurement had delivery of the cars to begin in 2023. In September 2018, Metro issued a request for proposals from manufacturers for 256 railcars with options for a total of up to 800. The agency originally planned to award the contract in 2019 and receive the first railcars in 2024. On October 6, 2020, Metro selected Hitachi Rail to construct the new railcars. The first order would replace the 2000 and 3000-series equipment, while the options, if selected, would allow the agency to increase capacity and retire the 6000-series.

The new 8000-series railcars will be built at a factory in Hagerstown, Maryland. In October 2022, Hitachi released its final design of the railcar manufacturing plant and test track, all of which are expected to be operational by early 2024.

Retired

1000-series 

The original order of 300 Metro cars was manufactured by Rohr Industries, with delivery in 1976. These cars were numbered 1000–1299, and rehabilitated in the mid-1990s by Breda Costruzioni Ferroviarie and WMATA at their Brentwood Shop in northeast Washington, D.C.

Features 
Two major characteristics distinguished the 1000-series from the later series cars. On their sides, the cars had two mylar curtain rollsigns, one above a window next to the doors on each end (while the other car classes have a single flip-dot or LED sign above a window next to the center doors). Second, the bulkheads on each end of the 1000-series cars featured windows that extended to the top of the bulkhead frame, whereas other car classes' bulkhead windows only extend slightly higher than the side windows. These cars were the only cars to have curtain rollsigns until about late 1984 as the system grew and they became a liability. During rehabilitation of these cars in 1993, an exterior loudspeaker was added in place of where one of the rollsigns used to be. The cars also received General Electric three-phase AC propulsion (same as that of the Breda A650 railcar used on LA Metro Rail), replacing the original Westinghouse cam-control DC propulsion systems, making them the first cars on the system to use such propulsion systems.

The 1000-series were the only cars to have more seating capacity than the other cars, with 82 seats. The original interiors had a white grained appearance with orange and brown seats. These cars had the standing capacity of 175 passengers, the same amount as their successors, until the arrival of the 7000-series cars, which increased the standing capacity.

Around August 2008, Metrorail tested new overhead handles of different styles on 1122, 1123, 1126, 1127, as well as some 3000-series cars to gauge public opinion.

Incidents 
Car 1076 was taken out of service after its mate was destroyed in the 2004 accident at the  station. Car 1028, separated from its mate after it was destroyed during the  derailment in 1982, became the feeler car (a car that checks system clearances) and was retired in April 2016. No. 1079 was the lead car on the second train involved in the June 22, 2009, Washington Metro train collision.

Following the June 22, 2009, collision, Metro implemented a policy of no longer placing 1000-series railcar pairs at the ends of trains in order to prevent telescoping in a collision, as they were the weakest rolling stock, structurally. The new policy placed 1000-series cars in the center of six and eight-car trains, with rail cars of other series in the end positions.

Retirement 
The 7000-series cars started replacing these cars in 2016. In July 2015, Metro released a request for proposals seeking a contractor to pick-up and dispose of Metro's entire remaining fleet of 1000-series railcars. Metro announced on June 7, 2017, that the 1000-series cars would be fully retired and removed from service on July 1, 2017, after running for 41 years. On October 27, 2017, WMATA announced that the last of the cars had been sent off property. However six cars numbered 8000-8005 remained in non-revenue work service, being used for the "money train". Cars 8000-8001 were retired in 2018 while cars 8002-8005 were retired on May 20, 2020.

Preservation and other uses 
 1000–1001 are preserved by WMATA.
 1090–1091 were sent to the Asymmetric Warfare Training Center at Fort AP Hill.
 1130–1131, 1236–1237, 1070–1071, and a fourth unidentified pair were taken to the Guardian Centers facility in Georgia.
 Four cars, formerly numbered 1010–1011 and 1044–1045, were renumbered to 8000–8003 and served as the "money train" to collect the revenue from station fare card machines. A third pair, 1092–1093, was converted in April 2016 and was renumbered to 8004–8005. Cars 8000–8001 were replaced by Alstom 6000-series cars 6182-6183 in 2018, and the other four were replaced by Breda 2000-series cars 2016-2017 on May 20, 2020.

4000-series 

The fourth order consisted of 100 cars from Breda, numbered 4000–4099. These cars were delivered in 1991.

Features 
There were some minor differences between these and the earlier Breda cars prior to rehabilitation. First, the bulkhead windows were rounded as compared to being squared, and like the 1000-series before refurbishment, these cars did not have exterior speakers.

These cars used the original flip-dot exterior destination signs, chopper-controlled DC propulsion system, and the original cream, orange and yellow interior all the way up to their retirement.

Incidents 
Car 4018 was damaged in the Woodley Park accident, but was eventually repaired.

On July 4, 2010, Metro took all 100 4000-series cars out of service to repair the door motors to prevent them from unintentionally opening while the train is in motion, a situation that Metro engineers were able to duplicate in a rail yard. On July 20, the cars were returned to service after the repair was completed.

Retirement 
These cars were to be rehabilitated starting 2014 onward based on design specifications that were partially drafted in 2010; however, WMATA indicated in subsequent budgets that it wished to replace these rail cars with an additional 100 7000-series cars instead of overhauling them. This resulted in an increase of new cars being delivered. According to an April 2013 Washington Post news story, the transit agency said that it would forgo updating the 4000-series rail cars, and Metro had exercised an option with Kawasaki to purchase an additional one hundred 7000-series cars to replace its 4000-series cars, costing an additional $215 million under the contract. In June 2015 Metro pulled all 4000-series railcars from service, following reports that doors were opening during travel; although no systemic problem was located, Metro kept the series out of service for more than a month to address door components that were below acceptable tolerance levels.

In July 2015, Metro released a request for proposals seeking a contractor to pick-up and then dispose of all 1000-series and 4000-series cars, as part of its plan to replace those cars with the new 7000-series cars. On November 17, 2016, Metro discovered a glitch in which a 4000-series car would display an incorrect speed limit to a train operator while in manual mode. All 4000-series cars were taken out of service in the afternoon, but were returned to service in the middle of trainsets. Metro announced that they would discontinue using 4000-series railcars in lead positions and considered accelerating the retirement of the cars to late 2017 or possibly earlier.
On February 6, 2017, Metro confirmed the accelerated retirement of the 4000-series cars due to their many reliability concerns. According to WMATA, "The 4000-series rail cars were by far Metro's least reliable, traveling an average of only  between delays. On June 7, 2017, Metro announced that the 4000-series cars would be fully retired and removed from service on July 1, 2017, and by that date, all cars were taken out of service. The last of the cars left for scrapping on February 13, 2018.

Preservation 
WMATA retained pair 4000–4001 as historic cars.

Other uses 
The Loudoun County Fire and Rescue Department acquired pair 4044–4045 for its Metrorail Training Simulator, which was dedicated on June 28, 2017.
In October 2017, cars 4020-4021 were spotted at the Mongomery County Public Safety Training Academy.
In April 2017, car 4089 was sliced into seven sections and turned into vendor kiosks at the Grosvenor-Strathmore Metro Station as part of the pop up vendors plaza, which opened from May to June 30.

5000-series 

The fifth order consisted of 192 rail cars from a joint venture of Construcciones y Auxiliar de Ferrocarriles (CAF) of Spain and AAI Corporation of Hunt Valley, Maryland. These cars are numbered 5000–5191, with delivery in 2001. Service introduction of these cars was heavily delayed due to software "glitches" which plagued delivery. At one point, WMATA looked to impose penalties against CAF for the service entry delays.

Features 
The contract consisted of CAF engineering, designing the cars, and managing the project, while AAI performed assembly. These cars were the first Metrorail cars to originally feature three-phase AC traction motors, this time with IGBT inverters. They were also the first to have LED destination signs on the exterior and LED "next stop" indication signs on the interiors. Along with these improvements, they were also the first to have intercar safety barriers (which have since been added to all other rolling stock) and railcar monitoring systems. The 5000-series cars premiered the red, white and blue interior. This interior color scheme has also been used on the 2000/3000-series rehabilitation project and the 6000-series cars from Alstom.

Another feature was the return of cast steel trucks, which were previously only used on the Rohr cars. This was done as a cost-saving measure, since fabricated trucks take additional time to manufacture due to the machining required.

Incidents 
The National Transportation Safety Board began an investigation about service life of these cars due to non-revenue service derailments in Metrorail yards and the January 7, 2007, derailment of a revenue train on the Green Line at the  station.

Cars 5066–5067 were involved in the June 2009 Washington Metro train collision, and 5152–5153 were involved in the Mount Vernon Square train derailment. Both cars were not repaired and were used for spare parts.

Retirement 
The planned midlife rehabilitation of the 5000-series cars was to take place in the late 2010s through the early 2020s. Design specifications were to be drafted in 2017 with the first cars rehabbed in 2022. This series of cars would have been the third series to have automated station announcements and the stainless steel paint scheme, which would have made them compatible with the 7000-series once the rehabilitation process was completed.

On June 4, 2015, the Federal Transit Administration approved an early decommission of the 5000-series railcars, which were replaced with 7000-series railcars instead of being rehabbed. Retirement process began in 2017, and WMATA announced that the last cars were removed from service on October 12, 2018, although cars were reported still in service up until October 17. After retirement, some cars were used for work service such as on de-icing tracks and on the Silver Line Phase 2 construction, where they tested the tracks on the line and polished the third rail. The cars retained for work service were ultimately retired in spring 2019.

Preservation
 5000–5001 are preserved by WMATA.
 5058–5059 were sold to a private investor. They were outside the West Hyattsville station since September 2019 but were cut in two pieces and removed in January 2020. As of June 2021, car 5058 was repurposed into a bar in Northeast DC.
 5112–5113 were donated to an unknown transit agency.

References

External links 

Rolling stock interiors – world.nycsubway.org

Lists of rolling stock
Rolling stock
Multiple units by railway company
Electric multiple units of the United States
750 V DC multiple units